Łosiów  is a village in the administrative district of Gmina Lewin Brzeski, within Brzeg County, Opole Voivodeship, in south-western Poland.

The village has a population of 1,510.

History

The first reference of the village originates from Bishop of Wrocław Żyrosław I's documents from 1189. Between 1207 and 1210 the village was the seat of the commandry for the Sovereign Military Order of Malta. In 1945 the village became part of Poland.

Demography

1998 - 1 589 
2002 - 1 560 
2009 - 1 535 
2011 - 1 510

Places of cultural and tourist interest

 John the Baptist's parish church (German: St. Johannes der Täufer Kirche), built in 1255 and property of the Sovereign Military Order of Malta. The present Baroque church was built in 1703, and between 1728 and 1731 - with restored Gothic walls.
 Park 
 Former evangelical church, deconstructed after 1945. At the present day a shop is located at its former location.

Gallery

References

Villages in Brzeg County